The list of listed buildings in Frederishavn Municipality enumerates historic buildings in Frederikshavn Municipality, Denmark, which have been recognised by the Danish Agency of Culture.

Note: This list is incomplete. A complete list of listed buildings in Vordingborg Municipality can be found on Danish Wikipedia.

The list

References

External links

 Danish Agency of Culture

 
Frederikshavn